All in the Mind is a weekly Australian Broadcasting Corporation Radio National program, exploring the mind, brain and behaviour.  it is hosted by journalist and podcaster Sana Qadar.

The radio program has won a number of awards, including the Grand Medal at the 2008 New York Radio Festival for a series of shows entitled The Brain Under Siege.
 
It was previously (since at least January 2003) hosted by Australian science journalist Natasha Mitchell, who was an MIT Knight Science Journalism Fellow in 2005–6.

References

External links
 

Australian Broadcasting Corporation radio programs
Science radio programmes